The Personal Service Workers' Union (GPA) was a trade union representing service workers in Austria.

The union was founded by the Austrian Trade Union Federation in 1945.  By 1977, it had 22,107 members, of whom more than 90% were women.  The following year, it merged with the Hotel and Restaurant Workers' Union, to form the Hotel, Catering and Personal Services Union.

Presidents
1945: Friedrich Schubert
c.1960: Adalbert Busta

References

Trade unions established in 1945
Trade unions disestablished in 1978
Trade unions in Austria
1945 establishments in Austria
1978 disestablishments in Austria